Child star may refer to:
 Child actor
 Child model
"Child Star", a song by The Unicorns from their 2003 album Who Will Cut Our Hair When We're Gone?
"Child Star", a song by Tyrannosaurus Rex from their 1968 album My People Were Fair and Had Sky in Their Hair... But Now They're Content to Wear Stars on Their Brows
 Child Star, the autobiography of Shirley Temple (1928 – 2014)
 "Child Star" (Glee), an episode of the TV series
 "Child Star" (Cow and Chicken), an episode of the TV series
 Childstar, is a 2004 comedy film
 The Child Star, a 2011 album by Nathaniel Motte with Awol One

See also
 Dickie Roberts: Former Child Star, a 2003 film
Star-Child, a 1977 musical composition